Hans-Georg Reimann (born 24 August 1941 in Starrischken, Municipality Heydekrug) is a former East German race walker, who started for the SC Dynamo Berlin and the GDR and won two Olympic medals in 20 km racewalking. He finished third at the 1972 Summer Olympics in Munich in (1:27:17 hours) and finished second at the 1976 Summer Olympics in Montréal in (1:25:14 hours).

He won the silver medal (1:36:14.2 hours) at the 1962 European Championships. He - synchronously with Peter Frenkel - went a world record (1:25:19.4 hours). Four years later and he was flag bearer of the GDR team at the opening of the 1976 Summer Olympics. 

Reimann became first an engineer for measuring and automatic control. After the end of his sporting career he worked as a trainer for racewalkers. After the end of the GDR he became a pharmacy representative and lived in Neufahrn bei Freising. Reimann started for SC Dynamo Berlin and trained with Max Weber. In his athletic career he was 1.80 meters large and weighed 65 kg.

References 

https://www.leichtathletik-berlin.de/start.html - Berlin Athletics Association

1941 births
Living people
East German male racewalkers
Athletes (track and field) at the 1964 Summer Olympics
Athletes (track and field) at the 1968 Summer Olympics
Athletes (track and field) at the 1972 Summer Olympics
Athletes (track and field) at the 1976 Summer Olympics
Olympic athletes of East Germany
Olympic bronze medalists for East Germany
Olympic silver medalists for East Germany
European Athletics Championships medalists
Medalists at the 1976 Summer Olympics
Medalists at the 1972 Summer Olympics
Olympic silver medalists in athletics (track and field)
Olympic bronze medalists in athletics (track and field)
World Athletics Race Walking Team Championships winners